Bracovce is a village and municipality in the Michalovce District in the Košice Region of Slovakia.

History
In historical records, the village was first mentioned in 1227.

Geography
The village lies at an altitude of 105 metres and covers an area of  (2020-06-30/-07-01).

Population 
It has a population of 930 people (2020-12-31).

Genealogical resources

The records for genealogical research are available at the state archive "Statny Archiv in Presov, Slovakia"

 Roman Catholic church records (births/marriages/deaths): 1790-1895 (parish B)
 Greek Catholic church records (births/marriages/deaths): 1786-1922 (parish B)
 Lutheran church records (births/marriages/deaths): 1783-1895 (parish B)

See also
 List of municipalities and towns in Slovakia

References

External links
Statistics
Surnames of living people in Bracovce

Villages and municipalities in Michalovce District
Zemplín (region)